Samuel Judah (1798/9 – 29 April 1869) was an American lawyer and politician. Born either 10 July 1788 or 18 July 1799, son of Benjamin S. Judah, a doctor, he graduated in 1816 in Law from Rutgers University (then Queen's College) the first Jew to do so. He was called to the bar the same year. He lived in Vincennes, Indiana, but practiced law nationally. He was elected to the Indiana House of Representatives from 1827 to 1829. In 1830 he was the United States Attorney for the District of Indiana.  He was once again in the House of Representatives from 1839 to 1841, and was Speaker of the Indiana House of Representatives in 1840.

Family
Judah married Harriet Brandon (1808-1884) on 22 June 1825. They had one son Samuel Brandon Judah (b. 1845). Of ten children born, four died in infancy and six survived to adulthood.  The 1860 census lists sons, Samuel, John, and Nobel and her daughter, Alice, who was then 23.  Six children survived to adulthood.  Caroline married John Mantle.  Catherine married General Lazarus Nobel.  Alice married Franklin Clark.  Samuel B. Judah married first Emily Burnett and then Prudence Keplinger. John Mantle Judah married Mary Saunders Jameson. Nobel Branson Judah married Karherin Hutchinson.

Legacy
Judah left an archive of some 1,000 letters.
The law firm that Samuel Judah established has continued uninterrupted for 200 years.

References

1790s births
1869 deaths
People from Vincennes, Indiana
United States Attorneys for the District of Indiana
Year of birth uncertain